Dudley is a male given name. Notable people with the name include:

Dudley Benjafield (1887–1957), British doctor and racing driver
Dudley Bradley (born 1957), American basketball player
Dudley Bradstreet (1711–1763), Irish adventurer and secret agent
Dudley Bradstreet (magistrate) (1648–1702), American magistrate
Dudley Buck (1839–1909), American composer
Dudley Carleton (disambiguation), several people
Dudley Chase (1771–1846), American senator from Vermont
Dudley Clarke (1899–1974), British army officer
Dudley Connell (born 1956), American bluegrass singer
Dudley de Chair (1864–1958), Canadian naval officer and governor of New South Wales
Dudley DeGroot (1899–1970), American footballer and coach
Dudley de Silva (1911–1974), Sri Lankan Sinhala educationist
Dudley Digges (c. 1583–1639), English diplomat and politician
Dudley Digges (actor) (1879–1947), Irish stage and film actor
Dudley Doolittle (1881–1957), American politician 
Dudley Evans (1886–1972), English cricketer
Dubhaltach Mac Fhirbhisigh (fl. 1643–1671), Irish scribe, translator, historian and genealogist also known as Dudly Ferbisie
J. Dudley Goodlette (born 1948), American politician and lawyer
Dudley Gordon, 3rd Marquess of Aberdeen and Temair 1883–1972), British peer, soldier and industrialist
Dudley Hart (born 1968), American professional golfer
Dudley R. Herschbach (born 1932), American chemist, winner of the 1986 Nobel Prize in Chemistry
Dudley Hooper (1911–1968), British accountant and early promoter of electronic data processing
Dudley Mays Hughes (1848–1927), American politician from Georgia
Darach Ó Catháin (1922-1987), Irish sean-nós singer, also known as Dudley Kane
Dudley Knowles, Scottish political philosopher and professor
Dudley J. LeBlanc, American politician and Louisiana state senator
Dudley Le Souef (1856–1923), Australian ornithologist
Dudley Moore (1935–2002), English actor and comedian
Dudley Murphy (1897–1968), American film director
Dudley Nichols (1895–1960), American screenwriter
Dudley Nourse (1910–1981), South African cricketer
Dudley Perkins (disambiguation), several people
Dudley Pope (1925–1997), British writer of nautical fiction and history
Dudley Pope (cricketer) (1906–1934), English cricketer
Dudley Pound (1877–1943), British Admiral of the Fleet and First Sea Lord
Dudley Richards (1932–1961), American figure skater
Dudley Rippon (1892–1963), English cricketer
Dudley Roberts (born 1945), English footballer
Dudley Ryder (disambiguation)
Dudley Senanayake (1911–1973), 2nd, 6th and 8th Prime Minister of Ceylon
Dudley Spade (born 1956), American politician
Dudley Stamp (1898–1966), British geographer
Dudley Storey (1939–2017), New Zealand Olympic rower
Dudley Tyler (born 1944), English footballer
Dudley Wanaguru (1924–2002), Sri Lankan Sinhala cinema actor
Dudley D. Watkins (1907–1969), English cartoonist and creator of Oor Wullie

Fictional characters:
Dudley, angel in the film The Bishop's Wife played by Cary Grant
Dudley, British boxer from the Street Fighter video game series
Dudley "Booger" Dawson, a character in the Revenge of the Nerds franchise
Dudley Dursley, character in the Harry Potter books and films
Dudley Mafee, character in Billions (TV series), former employee of Axe Capital and later employed by Mason Taylor Capital
Dudley Do Nothing, character in Shorty McShorts' Shorts
Dudley Do-Right, animated Canadian Mountie
Dudley Liam Smith, James Ellroy's L.A. Confidential villain
Dudley Puppy, one of the main protagonists of Nickelodeon's T.U.F.F. Puppy
Dudley Ramsey, character in Diff'rent Strokes

See also
 Dudley (disambiguation)
 Dudley (surname)

Masculine given names